Château de la Croix des Gardes, also known as Villa Perrier, is a mansion in the La Croix-des-Gardes district of Cannes on the French Riviera. It appears as the Sandford Villa in the Alfred Hitchcock's 1955 film To Catch a Thief, with Cary Grant and Grace Kelly.

History
The mansion was built in a Medici style, and the gardens were designed in a matching Italianate style. In 1960, it was purchased by Gustave Leven, who owned the Perrier brand of bottled mineral water. He hired architect Alan Gore to re-design the facade in the Palladian architectural style as well as the swimming-pool, under the guidance of architect Andreï Svetchine.

Since Leven's death it has been owned by a "group of investors" and is for sale for Euro 50-100 million.

References

Houses completed in 1919
Buildings and structures in Cannes
20th-century architecture in France